İlhan Parlak (born 19 January 1987) is a Turkish professional footballer who plays as a forward for Kayserispor.

Club career
In July 2007, Parlak was bought by Fenerbahçe from Kayserispor and signed a five-year contract. It was speculated that Real Madrid and Valencia also wanted to sign him in the 2007–08 transfer season. On 14 June, Parlak was transferred to Ankaraspor along with Özgür Çek and €4.2 million in return for Özer Hurmacı.

He is famous for his quick goal (scored in 15 seconds) against Sivasspor at the 32nd week of the 2005–06 season.

Parlak left Kayseri Erciyesspor in the 2015–16 winter transfer window.

International career
In the 2006 European U19 Championships, despite Turkey disappointing their fans by losing all three of their group stage encounters, Parlak was crowned with the golden boot at the tournament scoring five goals in three appearances.

References

İlhan Parlak Gaziantepspor'da, fanatik.com.tr, 7 January 2016

External links

1987 births
Living people
People from Yahyalı
Association football midfielders
Association football forwards
Turkish footballers
Turkey under-21 international footballers
Turkey youth international footballers
Kayserispor footballers
Fenerbahçe S.K. footballers
Ankaraspor footballers
MKE Ankaragücü footballers
Kardemir Karabükspor footballers
Süper Lig players